Sar Utha Ke Jiyo is a 1998 Indian Hindi-language action film directed by Sikander Bharti, starring Naseeruddin Shah, Madhoo, Manek Bedi, Raza Murad, Kiran Kumar and Gulshan Grover.

Cast
Naseeruddin Shah as Inspector Vijay Khanna
Madhoo
Manek Bedi as Suraj Khanna
Raza Murad
Smita Jaykar   
Kiran Kumar
Gulshan Grover   
Laxmikant Berde   
Mohan Joshi
Arjun   
Veeru Devgan 
Ajay Devgn as Special Appearance 
Salman Khan as Special Appearance  
Sunil Shetty as Special Appearance 
Ayesha Jhulka as Special Appearance 
Umesh Mehra as Special Appearance
 Gracy Singh as Special Appearance

Production

Critical reception

Soundtrack
"Baadal Garajane Laga Saawan Barasne Laga" - Udit Narayan, Anuradha Paudwal
"Darwaza Khula Tha" - Udit Narayan, Poornima
"Deewana Deewana" - Kumar Sanu, Sadhana Sargam
"Meri Zindagi Meri Jaan" - Sonu Nigam, Suresh Wadkar
"Meri Zindagi Meri Jaan v2" - Sonu Nigam, Suresh Wadkar, Chandana Dixit
"Mujhko Maar Gaya" - Mohammed Aziz
"Ya Allah Mujko Bacha" - Alka Yagnik, Abhijeet

References

External links
 

1998 films
1990s Hindi-language films
Indian action films
Films scored by Anand–Milind
1998 action films
Hindi-language action films